Le Folgoët is a commune in the Finistère department and administrative region of Brittany in north-western France.

Population
In French the inhabitants of Le Folgoët are known as Folgoëtiens.

See also
Communes of the Finistère department
List of the works of Bastien and Henry Prigent
List of works of the two Folgoët ateliers
List of the works of the Maître de Plougastel

References

External links
Official website 

Mayors of Finistère Association 

Communes of Finistère